The Finnish Film Foundation is an independent foundation with the task of supporting and developing Finnish film production, distribution and exhibition. It is supervised by the Department for Cultural Policy in the Ministry of Education and Culture.

The foundation is supported by grants from the Finnish national lottery. The Finnish Film Foundation’s headquarters with its cinema are located in Katajanokka, Helsinki in a 19th-century harbour terminal.

The foundation is responsible for the export and international promotion of Finnish films. It also grants film production support for individual films, with an aim of supporting "high quality" productions.

The Managing Director of the foundation is Lasse Saarinen, who replaced Irina Krohn as director in 2016.

See also
 Finnish Film Archive
 List of film institutes

External links
 Finnish Film Foundation

Foundations based in Finland
Film organisations in Finland
Mass media in Helsinki